Gauruncus argillus is a species of moth of the family Tortricidae. It is found in Loja Province, Ecuador.

The wingspan is 19.5 mm. The ground colour of the forewings is cream, tinged and partly suffused with ochreous and orange and the strigulation (fine streaking) is pale brownish. The base and costal area are brownish and the markings are pale brown. The hindwings are whitish, with grey strigulation.

Etymology
The species name refers to the whitish hindwings and is derived from Latin argillus (meaning potters clay).

References

Moths described in 2006
Euliini
Moths of South America
Taxa named by Józef Razowski